Yomar Álamo (born 6 March 1995) is a Puerto Rican professional boxer who has held the WBO–NABO light welterweight title since 2019. As of June 2020, he is ranked as the world's sixth best active light welterweight by the WBO.

Professional career
Álamo made his professional debut on 27 April 2013, defeating Carlos Acevedo via first-round technical knockout (TKO) in under a minute in Caguas, Puerto Rico. He signed an exclusive promotional contract with Miguel Cotto Promotions and H2 Entertainment the following month, although he would soon switch to Carlos Maldonado's Black Tiger Promotions. He won the WBC FECARBOX light welterweight title in his eleventh fight, a second-round TKO of Edgardo Rivera in his hometown of Aguas Buenas on 13 August 2016. It was the first WBC fight ever held in the city, and his younger brother Yamil debuted earlier on the card with a victory. He successfully retained the belt two months later against veteran fighter Edwin López at the Roberto Clemente Coliseum in San Juan after his opponent failed to answer the bell for the second round.

In 2017 Álamo had two fights: he beat journeyman Juan Carlos Contreras in Santo Domingo, his first contest outside his home nation, and then knocked out Hungarian prospect Zsigmond Vass in the first round in Aguas Buenas to collect the vacant WBC Youth light welterweight title. The latter made history again as it was the first WBC Youth title fight ever held in Puerto Rico, and was attended by WBC president Mauricio Sulaimán for the occasion. After this he signed with Miami-based promoter Felix "Tutico" Zabala Jr. and his All Star Promotions in early 2018, and had a non-title victory over Colombian rival Wilfrido Buelvas at the Kissimmee Civic Center in Kissimmee, Florida that July. He also began training under former two-division world champion Iván Calderón in Guaynabo.

On 22 February 2019 he received a shot at the vacant WBO–NABO light welterweight title, facing "La Tormenta" Manuel Méndez, again in Kissimmee, in the main event of a card celebrating the 30th anniversary of the Boxeo Telemundo series on the Spanish-language network. Álamo won the belt with a ten round unanimous decision victory (100–90, 99–91, 99–91) that moved him to 16–0. At a title celebration in his hometown of Aguas Buenas a few days later, he was given an award of recognition by mayor Javier García Pérez on behalf of the House of Representatives of Puerto Rico. His first title defence was set to be against Mexican fighter Miguel Angel Martínez, but Martínez was pulled from the show to be plugged into another card as a replacement. He instead faced Salvador Briceño in August 2019 and scored his second straight unanimous decision victory (98–92, 98–92, 96–94). Two months later he fought Antonio Morán to a ten-round split draw (97–93, 95–95, 94–96) in a Boxeo Telemundo main event, retaining again but suffering the first blemish on his undefeated record.

Álamo matched up against undefeated Mexican-American prospect Kendo Castañeda in another Boxeo Telemundo headliner on 28 February 2020, making his third defence of the NABO light welterweight title. Before the fight, Castañeda said that Álamo had only fought taxicab drivers and he would turn him into one. The Puerto Rican went on to defeat the San Antonio native by majority decision (98–92, 97–93, 95–95), prompting a further push to #6 in the WBO rankings.

Professional boxing record

References

External links
 

Living people
1995 births
Puerto Rican male boxers
Light-welterweight boxers
People from Aguas Buenas, Puerto Rico
People from Caguas, Puerto Rico